Kalupara Ghat railway station is a railway station on the East Coast Railway network in the state of Odisha, India. It serves Kalakaleswar village. Its code is KAPG. It has three platforms. Passenger, MEMU, Express and Superfast trains halt at Kalupara Ghat railway station. ଏହା ଏକ ବିରାଟ railway ଷ୍ଟେସନ।ଏଠାରେ ଟ୍ରେନ ବହତ lateକୁ ଆସିଥାଏ।

Major trains
 East Coast Express
 Hirakhand Express
 Bhubaneshwar-Visakhapatnam Intercity Express
 Puri–Tirupati Express
 Howrah–Sathya Sai Prasanthi Nilayam Express
 Puri–Ahmedabad Express

See also
 Khordha district

Gallery

References

Railway stations in Khorda district
Khurda Road railway division